Line 2 of the Rio de Janeiro Metro serves working-class residential neighborhoods extending toward the north. It is a diagonal line, and almost completely over ground (mostly at graded and partly elevated). This line started as a light rail, but for increasing commuters, it gradually changed to metro. Due to its origin as light rail, it is at-grade except for Estácio station, although Cidade Nova station will be elevated.

External links
Map of Line 2

Rio de Janeiro Metro
Rio de Janeiro - Line 2